The New Zealand cricket team toured the Netherlands in August 2022 to play two Twenty20 International (T20I) matches. It was the first time that the New Zealand team had toured the Netherlands since 1986. The tour was originally scheduled for to take place in June 2020 before it was postponed in April 2020 due to the COVID-19 pandemic. On 19 July 2022, the date of the second T20I was brought forward by one day due to a cancellation of a connecting flight for the New Zealand team's tour of the West Indies. During the 2022 summer, New Zealand also toured England, Ireland and Scotland prior to this series.

Squads

Adam Milne was ruled out of New Zealand's squad due to an Achilles injury with Jacob Duffy named as his replacement.

T20I Series

1st T20I

2nd T20I

References

External links
 Series home at ESPNcricinfo

2022 in New Zealand cricket
2022 in Dutch cricket
International cricket competitions in 2022
International cricket tours of the Netherlands
New Zealand cricket tours abroad
Cricket events postponed due to the COVID-19 pandemic